The Resolution Tour was a concert tour by American heavy metal band Lamb of God in support of the group's seventh studio album, Resolution, which was released in January 2012.

Overview
The tour begin on January 22, 2012 with a concert at the band's hometown of Richmond, Virginia. After a North American leg, the band toured Asia, Australia (performing on the Soundwave Festival), and Latin America. In May 2012, the band played dates in India and Israel before beginning a month-long European leg.

On June 28, 2012, shortly after the band had landed in Ruzyně Airport for their scheduled concert that night in Prague, vocalist Randy Blythe was arrested on charges of manslaughter over an incident that took place more than two years ago. According to reports, a 19-year-old man named Daniel N. was pushed by Blythe after he leaped on stage during the band's last concert in Prague at the club Abaton on May 24, 2010. The man fell directly on his head, causing serious brain trauma and eventually lapsing into coma. He died from his injuries a few weeks later. Representatives of the band have said that Blythe is "wrongly accused" and that they "expect him to be fully exonerated". On June 30, 2012, the Prague 8 District Court ruled that Blythe be remanded in custody, as he was considered a flight risk. The judge ruled that Blythe may be released on a bail of CZK4,000,000, approximately US$200,000. The concert in Prague and festival appearances at With Full Force in Germany and the Tuska Open Air Metal Festival in Finland were canceled as a result. On July 17, 2012, a panel of three judges in Prague Municipal Court reviewed the Prague 8 District Court's bail decision as challenged by the prosecutor. Blythe's bail was subsequently doubled to CZK8,000,000, approximately US$400,000.

On July 26, 2012, it was confirmed that the group's upcoming U.S. tour with Dethklok and Gojira was canceled, due to Blythe's continued incarceration in Prague. On August 2, 2012, Blythe was released from custody after spending more than a month in prison in Prague. On August 3, 2012, the band announced that a U.S. tour would be rebooked, to begin on October 30, 2012. The band's previously canceled appearances at the two Knotfest events, the inaugural music festival created by Slipknot to be held in mid-August, was reinstated following Blythe's release.

On September 5, 2012, the band announced a 38-date U.S. tour starting October 30, 2012 in Phoenix, Arizona, with In Flames as main support. Hatebreed performed from October 30 to November 19, Hellyeah performed from November 20 to December 16, and British band Sylosis was the opening act on all dates. Bassist John Campbell  had to pull out due to a family emergency on November 11, 2013 and the show at the ShoWare Center in Kent was canceled. He rejoined the tour in 2014 but during that time, Fear Factory bassist Matt DeVries filled in for him. In 2014, guitarist Mark Morton had to pull out due to a family emergency. Paul Waggoner from Between the Buried and Me filled in for him.

Tour dates

Canceled dates

Support acts
 The Acacia Strain (January 24–28, 2012; June 12–20, 2013)
 Too Late the Hero (January 24–26 and 28, 2012)
 Manahan (January 27, 2012)
 Chthonic (February 16, 22 and 23, 2012)
 The Black Dahlia Murder (February 18, 28 and March 1, 2012)
 In Flames (February 28–March 1, 2012; October 30–December 16, 2012)
 Hatebreed (March 31–April 10, 2012; October 30–November 19, 2012)
 Lacuna Coil (March 31–April 4, 2012)
 Betzefer (May 30, 2012)
 Decapitated (June 5, 2012; May 16–June 20, 2013)
 DevilDriver (June 6, 2012)
 Sylosis  (June 12 and 13, 2012; October 30–December 16, 2012)
 Hellyeah (November 20–December 1; December 3–16, 2012)
 Anciients (May 16–June 10, 2013)
 Meshuggah  (September 20–26, 2013) 
 Mind Assault  (January 24 and 25, 2014)

Personnel
Randy Blythe – vocals
Mark Morton – guitars
Willie Adler – guitars
John Campbell – bass guitar
Chris Adler – drums

Temporary replacements
Matt DeVries – bass guitar [filling in for John Campbell  from November 12–26, 2013] 
Paul Waggoner – guitars [filling in for Mark Morton on 2014 dates]

References

2012 concert tours
2013 concert tours
2014 concert tours
Lamb of God (band) concert tours